Atreseries is a Spanish television channel owned by Atresmedia which was released on 22 December 2015.

Atreseries release historical TV series in Antena 3 and La Sexta, and films.

Its programming includes Allí abajo, Aquí no hay quien viva, Compañeros, Covert Affairs, Crimen en el paraíso, Cuerpo de élite, El amor está en el aire, El barco, El internado, El síndrome de Ulises, Fiscal Chase, Física o química, La familia Mata, La tira, Looking, Los hombres de Paco, Los protegidos, Me resbala, Ninja Warrior, Rizzoli & Isles, Se ha escrito un crimen, Sorpresa ¡Sorpresa! and The Listener.

Atresmedia also has Atreseries Internacional, a signal aimed at payment platforms in America and Europe, which only transmits Antena 3's own programming.

References

Atresmedia Televisión